The Carlos Palanca Memorial Awards for Literature winners in the year 1983 (rank, title of winning entry, name of author).

English division
Novel
Special prize: "The Standard Bearer" by Edilberto K. Tiempo

Short story
First prize: "Oldtimer" by Jose Y. Dalisay Jr.
Second prize: "Games" by Jesus Cruz
Third prize: "Perfect Sunday" by Jose L. Ayala

Poetry
First prize: "Seeress and Voyager" by Rowena Tiempo Torrevillas; and "The Other Clearing" by Gemino Abad Jr.
Second prize: "The Words and Other Poems" by Francis Macansantos; and "Thin Poems Occasioned by Big and Small Events" by Alfredo N. Salanga
Third prize: "Axioms" by Simeon Dumdum, Jr.; "The Chameleon" by Cesaro Syjuco; and "The Time Factor" by Ophelia Dimalanta

Essay
First prize: "Rizal, Balaguer and Teilhard: Convergence at the Luneta" by Gregorio Brillantes
Second prize: "Letters to the President" by Adrian Cristobal
Third prize: "Tertulias at San Jose and a Family Album" by Marjorie Evasco

One-act play
First prize: No winner
Second prize: "Waiting for Noriyushi" by Herminia Sison
Third prize: "The Chieftain's Daughter" by Felix A. Clemente
Special mention "Brief Passage" by Jessie B. Garcia; and "Standard Overhauling Procedure" by Dong Delos Reyes

Full-length play

Filipino division
Novel
Grand prize: "Dekada '70" by Lualhati Bautista; and "Ficcion" by Edel Garcellano

Short story
First prize: "Pinagdugtong-dugtong na Hininga Mula sa Iskinitang..." by Agapito M. Pugay
Second prize: "Mga Sugat sa Dibdib ni Sister Faina" by Fidel Rillo, Jr.
Third prize: "Buwan, Buwan, Hulugan Mo Ako ng Sundang" by Lualhati Bautista; and "Tayong Mga Maria Magdalena" by Fanny A. Garcia

Poetry
First prize: "Sa Panahon ng Ligalig" by Jose F. Lacaba
Second prize: "Basal ang Bungo Ko" by David T. Mamaril
Third prize: "Pamamangka at iba pang Pagsasagwan" by Teo T. Antonio

Essay
First prize: "Ang Kontemporaryong Nobelang Tagalog" by Rosario Torres-Yu
Second prize: "Ukol sa Isang Komprehensibong Panunuring Pampanitikan" by Pedro L. Ricarte
Third prize: "Mula Kay Maria Clara Hanggang Kay Connie Escobar" by Lilia Quindoza Santiago

One-act play
First prize: "Huling Gabi sa Maragondon" by Rene O. Villanueva
Second prize: "Liwanag sa Karimlan" by Roberto Jose De Guzman
Third prize: "Bulkang Sumambulat ang... Pigsa" by Dong Delos Reyes; and "Madawag na Lupa" by Pedro L. Ricarte

Full-length play
First prize: "Mga Abong Pangarap" by Ruth Elynia S. Mabanglo
Second prize: "Batang PRO" by Bienvenido Noriega Jr.
Third prize: "Isang Pangyayari sa Planas Site" by Tony Perez

References
 

Palanca Awards
Palanca Awards, 1983